Indira Gandhi Stadium may refer to:

Indira Gandhi Arena, an indoor games stadium in Delhi, India
Indira Gandhi Athletic Stadium, a football stadium in Guwahati, Assam, India
Indira Gandhi International Sports Stadium, a multipurpose sports stadium in Haldwani, Uttarakhand, India
Indira Gandhi Sports Stadium, a multipurpose sports stadium in Puducherry, India
Indira Gandhi Stadium, Kohima, a multipurpose sports stadium in Kohima, Nagaland, India
Indira Gandhi Stadium, Alwar, a cricket stadium in Alwar, Rajasthan, India
Indira Gandhi Stadium, Solapur, a cricket stadium in Solapur, Maharashtra, India
Indira Gandhi Stadium, Una, a cricket stadium in Una, Himachal Pradesh, India
Indira Gandhi Stadium, Purnia, a 10,000-capacity cricket stadium in Purnia, Bihar, India
Indira Gandhi Stadium, Vijayawada, a cricket stadium in Vijayawada, Andhra Pradesh, India